The Rural Municipality of Great Bend No. 405 is a rural municipality (RM) in the Canadian province of Saskatchewan within Census Division No. 16 and  Division No. 6.

History 
The RM of Great Bend No. 405 incorporated as a rural municipality on December 12, 1910. It was originally formed as Local Improvement District (LID) No. 405 on June 4, 1910 through the amalgamation of LIDs 20-E-3 (originally established June 5, 1905), 20-D-3 (originally established August 13, 1906), and 21-D-3 (originally established November 14, 1906).

Geography

Communities and localities 
The following urban municipalities are surrounded by the RM.

Towns
 Radisson

Villages
 Borden

The following unincorporated communities are within the RM.

Localities
 Great Deer

Demographics 

Economy 
The majority of economic activity in the area is related to agriculture, predominantly grain farming and cattle ranching.

Government 
The RM of Great Bend No. 405 is governed by an elected municipal council and an appointed administrator that meets on the second Wednesday of every month. The reeve of the RM is Gary Nickel while its administrator is Diane Tracksell. The RM's office is located in Borden.

Notable people 
John Diefenbaker, the 13th Prime Minister of Canada, lived here as a child from 1906 until 1910, when the family moved to Saskatoon.

References 

 

G

Division No. 16, Saskatchewan